Lauren Rochelle Ervin (born March 24, 1985) is an American women's basketball player with Women's National Basketball Association (WNBA). She attended the University of Kansas as a freshman, then Mt. San Antonio College for her sophomore year, before transferring to the University of Arkansas for her junior and senior year. She was drafted by the Connecticut Sun in the third round of the 2008. Due to her ACL injury, she did not join the Sun until the 2009 season.
She played six months in the Swedish Women's Basketball League 2008/09, before heading back to the US. She made the 11-woman opening day roster but was cut when Sandrine Gruda reported to the team in July. The Washington Mystics signed Ervin to a training camp contract in 2010.

High school
Ervin played for Inglewood High School in Inglewood, California, where she was named a WBCA All-American. She participated in the 2002 WBCA High School All-America Game where she scored four points.

Kansas and Arkansas statistics
Source

References

1985 births
Living people
American expatriate basketball people in Italy
American expatriate basketball people in Sweden
American women's basketball players
Arkansas Razorbacks women's basketball players
Basketball players from Inglewood, California
Connecticut Sun draft picks
Connecticut Sun players
Forwards (basketball)
Inglewood High School (California) alumni